Paprotnia may refer to the following places:
Paprotnia, Brzeziny County in Łódź Voivodeship (central Poland)
Paprotnia, Rawa County in Łódź Voivodeship (central Poland)
Paprotnia, Zduńska Wola County in Łódź Voivodeship (central Poland)
Paprotnia, Lublin Voivodeship (east Poland)
Paprotnia, Kozienice County in Masovian Voivodeship (east-central Poland)
Paprotnia, Siedlce County in Masovian Voivodeship (east-central Poland)
Paprotnia, Sochaczew County in Masovian Voivodeship (east-central Poland)
Paprotnia, Greater Poland Voivodeship (west-central Poland)